Le Grand (also Legrand) is an unincorporated community and census-designated place (CDP) in Merced County, California, United States. The population was 1,592 at the 2020 census, down from 1,659 at the 2010 census.

History
The first post office opened in 1896. The name honors William Le Grand Dickinson, who sold the railroad (the San Francisco and San Joaquin Valley Railroad, later the Atchison, Topeka and Santa Fe Railway Valley Division) land for the town.

Geography

Climate
According to the Köppen Climate Classification system, Le Grand has a warm-summer Mediterranean climate, abbreviated "Csa" on climate maps.

Demographics

2010
At the 2010 census Le Grand had a population of 1,659. The racial makeup of Le Grand was 869 (52.4%) White, 19 (1.1%) African American, 35 (2.1%) Native American, 17 (1.0%) Asian, 1 (0.1%) Pacific Islander, 659 (39.7%) from other races, and 59 (3.6%) from two or more races. Hispanic or Latino of any race were 1,357 persons (81.8%).

The whole population lived in households, no one lived in non-institutionalized group quarters and no one was institutionalized.

There were 458 households, 246 (53.7%) had children under the age of 18 living in them, 290 (63.3%) were opposite-sex married couples living together, 74 (16.2%) had a female householder with no husband present, 27 (5.9%) had a male householder with no wife present.  There were 24 (5.2%) unmarried opposite-sex partnerships, and 0 (0%) same-sex married couples or partnerships. 59 households (12.9%) were one person and 32 (7.0%) had someone living alone who was 65 or older. The average household size was 3.62.  There were 391 families (85.4% of households); the average family size was 3.96.

The age distribution was 534 people (32.2%) under the age of 18, 178 people (10.7%) aged 18 to 24, 418 people (25.2%) aged 25 to 44, 367 people (22.1%) aged 45 to 64, and 162 people (9.8%) who were 65 or older.  The median age was 31.5 years. For every 100 females, there were 99.4 males.  For every 100 females age 18 and over, there were 94.3 males.

There were 503 housing units at an average density of 441.1 per square mile, of the occupied units 315 (68.8%) were owner-occupied and 143 (31.2%) were rented. The homeowner vacancy rate was 1.9%; the rental vacancy rate was 10.0%.  1,145 people (69.0% of the population) lived in owner-occupied housing units and 514 people (31.0%) lived in rental housing units.

2000
At the 2000 census there were 1,760 people, 463 households, and 414 families in the CDP. The population density was 491.4 people per square mile (189.8/km). The racial makeup of the CDP was 49.77% White, 0.57% African American, 1.53% Native American, 0.28% Asian, 0.40% Pacific Islander, 42.50% from other races, and 4.94% from two or more races. Hispanic or Latino of any race were 78.81%.

Of the 463 households 53.8% had children under the age of 18 living with them, 66.7% were married couples living together, 16.8% had a female householder with no husband present, and 10.4% were non-families. 8.9% of households were one person and 5.0% had someone living alone who was 65 years of age or older.  The average household size was 3.80 and the average family size was 3.98.

The age distribution was 40.2% under the age of 18, 9.4% from 18 to 24, 25.3% from 25 to 44, 16.4% from 45 to 64, and 8.7% who were 65 years of age or older.  The median age was 25 years. For every 100 females there were 96.2 males.  For every 100 females age 18 and over, there were 97.2 males.

The median household income was $28,894 and the median family income  was $29,565. Males had a median income of $26,094 versus $22,596 for females. The per capita income for the CDP was $10,389.  About 18.5% of families and 23.2% of the population were below the poverty line, including 27.8% of those under age 18 and 11.1% of those age 65 or over.

Government

References

Census-designated places in Merced County, California
Census-designated places in California
1896 establishments in California